Michelle Herman (born March 9, 1955 in Brooklyn, New York) is an American writer and a Professor of English at The Ohio State University.  Her most widely known work is the novel Dog, which WorldCat shows in 545 libraries and has been translated  into Italian. She has also written the novel Missing, which was awarded the Harold Ribalow Prize for Jewish fiction. She is married to Glen Holland, a still life painter. They have a daughter.

Biography 
Herman received a B.S. from Brooklyn College and an M.F.A. from the Iowa Writers' Workshop, after which she was a James Michener Fellow. She has taught since 1988 at the Ohio State University, where she directs both the M.F.A. Program in Creative Writing and an interdisciplinary graduate program in the arts.

She has received a  National Endowment for the Arts Fellowship in addition to her  James Michener Fellowship.

In addition to her novels, she has published a collection of short fiction, A New and Glorious Life.  "Auslander" which appears in the collection was also included in American Jewish Fiction: A Century of Stories by Gerald Shapiro

She has published two essay collections, the autobiographical The Middle of Everything, as well as the  2013 volume of personal essays, Stories We Tell Ourselves.   Her essay Dream Life, also appeared separately as a Kindle single.

She serves as an Advisory Editor for [http://thejournalmag.org/ The Journal'] with Kathy Fagan

Roberta Maierhofer viewed Herman's novel Missing as a literary gerontology example of the process of redefining one's self in advancing age.

 Bibliography 
Herman, Michelle. The Middle of Everything: Memoirs of Motherhood. Lincoln: University of Nebraska Press, 2005. 
Herman, Michelle. Dog: A Short Novel.  San Francisco: MacAdam/Cage Pub, 2005. 
Translated by Fenisia Giannini into Italian  as La mia vita con Phil 
Herman, Michelle. Missing. Columbus: Ohio State University Press, 1990. 
Herman, Michelle. A New and Glorious Life: Novellas. Pittsburgh: Carnegie Mellon University Press, 1998.  (contains: "A New and Glorious Life", "Auslander", and  "Hope Among Men")
Herman, Michelle. Stories We Tell Ourselves''  (contains "Dream Life" and "Seeing Things") Univ. of Ohio Press, 2013

References

External links 
  http://www.michelleherman.com
  https://web.archive.org/web/20131118060038/http://english.osu.edu/people/herman-0
  https://archive.today/20131119042520/http://mockingbird.creighton.edu/ncw/herman.htm

1955 births
Living people
People from Brooklyn
American women academics
Ohio State University faculty
American women writers
Brooklyn College alumni
21st-century American women